Guadalupe Rivera Marín (23 October 1924 – 15 January 2023) was a Mexican lawyer and politician. A member of the Institutional Revolutionary Party, she served in the Chamber of Deputies from 1961 to 1964 and again from 1979 to 1982. She was also a Senator from 1984 to 1988. She was the daughter of Diego Rivera and his second wife, Guadalupe Marín.

Rivera died on 15 January 2023, at the age of 98.

References

1924 births
2023 deaths
Mexican lawyers
Mexican women lawyers
20th-century Mexican politicians
20th-century Mexican women politicians
Institutional Revolutionary Party politicians
Members of the Chamber of Deputies (Mexico) for Mexico City
Members of the Chamber of Deputies (Mexico) for Guanajuato
Members of the Senate of the Republic (Mexico) for Guanajuato
Women members of the Senate of the Republic (Mexico)
Women members of the Chamber of Deputies (Mexico)
National Autonomous University of Mexico alumni
Politicians from Mexico City